Jeppes Reef, is a small rural town on the R570 road in Ehlanzeni District Municipality in the Mpumalanga province of South Africa,  south-southeast of Kaapmuiden, and just over  from the border with Eswatini.

A border control post operates between 07:00 and 20:00 between the two countries. The Swaziland side of the border post is known as Matsomo.

References

Populated places in the Nkomazi Local Municipality